Utricularia sandersonii, Sanderson's bladderwort, is a species of flowering plant in the bladderwort family. Originally described and published by the British botanist Daniel Oliver in 1865, it is a carnivorous evergreen perennial, endemic to northern KwaZulu-Natal and Transkei in South Africa.

Description
Carnivory occurs beneath the surface,  whereby tiny bladders on underground stems capture the micro-organisms which inhabit saturated soil. The visible parts of the plant are not carnivorous. Above ground it bears quantities of white flowers with pale blue markings, long forward-curved spurs and double lobes which resemble rabbits' ears.

Cultivation
It must be kept moist at all times and requires moderate lighting for continuous flowering. It is not able to perform self-pollination, so a male and a female specimen is needed for sexual reproduction, but asexual reproduction by fragmentation is much faster and easier. It has gained the Royal Horticultural Society's Award of Garden Merit.

Invasive plant
U. sandersonii is listed on the New Zealand National Pest Plant Accord since it is an invasive species.

See also 
 List of Utricularia species

References 

sandersonii
Carnivorous plants of Africa
Flora of the Cape Provinces
Flora of KwaZulu-Natal
Taxa named by Daniel Oliver